Chazaliella is a genus of flowering plants in the family Rubiaceae. It has about 20 species native to tropical Africa from Liberia to Tanzania and south to Zimbabwe.

Species 

Chazaliella abrupta (Hiern) E.M.A.Petit & Verdc.
Chazaliella anacamptopus (K.Schum.) E.M.A.Petit & Verdc.
Chazaliella coffeosperma (K.Schum.) Verdc.
Chazaliella cupulicalyx Verdc.
Chazaliella gossweileri (Cavaco) E.M.A.Petit & Verdc.
Chazaliella insidens (Hiern) E.M.A.Petit & Verdc.
Chazaliella letouzeyi Robbr.
Chazaliella longistylis (Hiern) E.M.A.Petit & Verdc.
Chazaliella lophoclada (Hiern) E.M.A.Petit & Verdc.
Chazaliella macrocarpa Verdc.
Chazaliella obanensis (Wernham) E.M.A.Petit & Verdc.
Chazaliella obovoidea Verdc.
Chazaliella oddonii (De Wild.) E.M.A.Petit & Verdc.
Chazaliella parviflora (R.D.Good) Verdc.
Chazaliella poggei (K.Schum.) E.M.A.Petit & Verdc.
Chazaliella ramisulca Verdc.
Chazaliella rotundifolia (R.D.Good) E.M.A.Petit & Verdc.
Chazaliella sciadephora (Hiern) E.M.A.Petit & Verdc.
Chazaliella viridicalyx (R.D.Good) Verdc.
Chazaliella wildemaniana (T.Durand ex De Wild.) E.M.A.Petit & Verdc.

References

External links 
 Kew World Checklist of Selected Plant Families, Chazaliella

Rubiaceae genera
Psychotrieae